Carlos Costa defeated Alberto Berasategui 3–6, 6–1, 6–4 to win the 1993 ATP Buenos Aires singles competition. Juan Gisbert-Schultze was the champion but did not defend his title.

Seeds

  Karel Nováček (first round)
  Carlos Costa (champion)
  Jaime Yzaga (first round)
  Richard Fromberg (first round)
  Emilio Sánchez (quarterfinals)
  Alberto Berasategui (final)
  Marcos Ondruska (first round)
  Younes El Aynaoui (quarterfinals)

Draw

Finals

Top half

Bottom half

References

External links
 1993 ATP Buenos Aires Singles draw

Singles
ATP